Gabrielle 'Gabby' Jupp (born 12 June 1997) is a British former artistic gymnast. A successful junior gymnast, she was part of the Great Britain senior team that won silver in the team event at the 2016 European Women's Artistic Gymnastics Championships in Bern. A series of serious knee injuries curtailed her elite level career, and she announced her retirement in 2019, aged 22.

Personal life 
She trained at Sapphire School of Gymnastics Limited in Hemel Hempstead and is coached by Steve Price. Her best events are balance beam and floor exercise.
Gabby Jupp was a torch bearer in the London 2012 Olympic torch relay where she ran with the Olympic flame through Harrow, London.

She attended Dame Alice Owen's School in Potters Bar, Hertfordshire and has 3 sisters, Jessica, Olivia and Bethany and a twin brother Luke.

Junior career
Originally, Jupp trained at Hendon Gymnastics Club in North London. After a disappointing first year at the British Espoir Championships (2009) she changed clubs and began training at the Sapphire School of Gymnastics Limited. When she returned to the British Espoir Championships the following year (2010), she placed 2nd in the all-around, 1st on beam and 3rd on floor.

2012
2012 was a good year for Jupp. After placing 2nd in the all-around at the British National Championships two consecutive years in her respective age category (once as an Espoir and once as a Junior), she finally placed 1st, as the British Junior Champion (2012). In the same year she also took the English Junior title. 
Gabby was part of the British Junior team at the 2012 European Women's Artistic Gymnastics Championships in Brussels, Belgium that came 4th. She also won a Bronze medal on Floor and came 5th in the All-Around competition and 6th on Balance Beam.
Too young to be considered for the London games, Jupp was given the opportunity to take part in an Olympic ambassador programme. This gave her the opportunity to watch the gymnastics live at The O2 Arena, alongside other events and enter the GB house.

Senior career

2013
In March, Gabby made her debut to Senior international competition at the FIG World Cup in Worcester (The American Cup), USA where she placed 6th all-around, 2nd on beams, 5th on bars and floor and 8th on vault   She went on to compete at the World Cup in Doha where she won Bronze on Balance Beam and the Uneven Bars.

At the British Championships, she became the Senior British All-Around Champion. She also won the British titles on Floor and Balance Beam, as well as a Silver on Uneven Bars behind 2008 Olympian, Becky Downie.

In April, she was chosen for the team competing at the 2013 European Artistic Gymnastics Championships in Moscow, Russia. During qualifiers she landed awkwardly from her Balance Beam dismount injuring her knee, and had to pull out of the competition. Her score qualified her for Balance Beam finals, despite the fall, but she had to return to the UK for medical assessment for her knee. The injury was later reported to be an ACL tear. Jupp had surgery in May and was out of competition for about a year. She told Hemel Today, "I kind of heard a snap but I didn't know how bad it was". She continued to say that she learnt a lot from her experience in Moscow and vowed to return to gymnastics when recovered.

2014 & 2015
Jupp returned to competition at the 2014 British Team Championships in September 2014 after tearing her ACL. She was chosen to join the team travelling to compete at the World Championships in Nanning, China with Becky Downie, Hannah Whelan, Claudia Fragapane, Ruby Harrold, Kelly Simm and Charlie Fellows. The British team qualified in 4th for the Team Final but finished 6th in the final itself. Jupp contributed to the team with scores on floor, uneven bars and balance beam.

Jupp was set to compete at the English Championships in March 2015 but unfortunately suffered another tear to her ACL in her right leg meaning she spent the rest of the year in recovery of her injuries.

2016
In April 2016, she participated at the 2016 British Artistic Gymnastics Championships; she won the bars title.

2019
In November 2019, Jupp announced that she had retired from Elite gymnastics in previous months due to consistent injuries.

Competitive Highlights

References

External links
 Gabrielle Jupp at British Gymnastics

Living people
British female artistic gymnasts
1997 births
People from the London Borough of Barnet
21st-century British women